Highway 320 is a highway in the Canadian province of Saskatchewan. It runs from Highway 2 near Domremy to Highway 20 near Crystal Springs.

Highway 320 also passes near Northern Light.

References

320